The former Jesuit Church (Église des Jésuites) is the parish church Sainte-Trinité-et-Saint-Georges (Alsatian: Sànkt-Georg- und Dreifàltigkeitskirich)  which is the main Roman Catholic sanctuary of Molsheim, France, and the principal 17th-century church building in the Rhine Valley. The church was built between 1615 and 1617 by the German architect Christoph Wamser, and consecrated on 26 August 1618. Molsheim's Jesuit church is considered one of the foremost examples of Gothic Survival architecture or, as it is called in German, :de:Nachgotik (posterior Gothic). It is listed as a Monument historique since 1939 by the French Ministry of Culture.

Molsheim's Jesuit College was founded in 1580 and dissolved in 1765. It served as Alsace's main university between 1618 and 1704, preceding the Lutheran Strasbourg University in importance. The church's construction was funded by the bishop of Strasbourg, Archduke Leopold V of Austria, who made a donation on his name saint's day, 15 November 1614.  Although a chapel inside is dedicated to Ignatius of Loyola, the church was dedicated from the start to the Holy Trinity (Heilige Dreifaltigkeit). It became the parish church of Molsheim and was dedicated to Saint-George in 1791, after the demolition of the city's former parish church, the previous Église Saint-Georges, on what is now the town's current market square (Place du marché).

The total length of the church, steeple and sacristy included, is 

Among the many features inside the richly ornate building, the Baroque Saint Ignatius' Chapel (1621–1630) in the north transept and the Rococo Our Lady's Chapel (1748) in the south transept stand out as the most visually striking.

See also
 List of Jesuit sites

References

Notes

Roman Catholic churches completed in 1617
17th-century Roman Catholic church buildings in France
Baroque buildings in France
Churches in Bas-Rhin
Monuments historiques of Bas-Rhin
Jesuit churches in France
Gothic Revival church buildings in France
Jesuit
1617 establishments in France